KBEZ (92.9 MHz, "92.9 The Drive") is a commercial FM radio station in Tulsa, Oklahoma, United States. It is owned by Griffin Communications and airs a classic hits radio format. Its studios are located in Downtown Tulsa and the transmitter is in the Osage Reservation north of Sand Springs, Oklahoma, broadcasting at 100,000 watts.

History

KBEZ first signed on the air in March of 1964 as KAKC-FM, the sister station to AM 970 KAKC (now KCFO). At first, it simulcast the AM station's programming but by the Summer of 1977, it was airing an easy listening format, taking the call sign KBEZ, with the last two call letters signifying "Easy." Over time, the number of instrumental easy songs decreased and the soft vocals increased, moving the station to a soft adult contemporary music format.

At noon on June 10, 2010, KBEZ dropped its longtime adult contemporary format and adopted an adult hits format. Along with the flip, KBEZ also changed its moniker from "92.9 KBEZ" to "92.9 BOB FM", using the slogan "We Play Anything!". The last song played on KBEZ before the flip was "Goodbye Yellow Brick Road" by Elton John.

At about noon on September 9, 2013, KBEZ changed from its former "We Play Anything" genre to Classic Hits of the 1960s, 1970s and 1980s, moving the station from adult hits to classic hits. The station later dropped most music from the 1960s to concentrate on 1970s, 1980s and some 1990s hits, using the slogan "Tulsa's Greatest Hits."

On August 1, 2017, KBEZ rebranded as "92.9 The Drive - Tulsa's Classic Hits!".

Ownership changes
On March 8, 2012, Renda announced that it was selling KHTT and KBEZ to Journal Communications for $11.8 million. The deal closed on June 25, 2012. Both KHTT and its sister KBEZ moved into the Journal Communications facility at 29th and Yale Avenue adjacent to the Broken Arrow Expressway joining the existing Journal stations KVOO, KXBL, and KFAQ.

Journal Communications (KBEZ's former owner) and the E. W. Scripps Company (owner of Tulsa's NBC network affiliate KJRH-TV) announced on July 30, 2014 that the two companies would merge to create a new broadcast company under the E. W. Scripps Company name that would own the two companies' broadcast properties, including KBEZ.

On June 26, 2018, parent company E. W. Scripps announced that it would sell KBEZ - along with its sister stations, KFAQ, KHTT, KVOO, and KXBL to Griffin Communications. Griffin began operating the stations under a local marketing agreement on July 30, and completed the purchase on October 1, at a price of $12.5 million; the company already owned CBS affiliate KOTV-DT and CW affiliate KQCW-DT.

Gunman
On January 13, 2010 just after 1 PM, 58-year-old Barry Styles came to KBEZ's offices and studios, and walked up and down the hallways demanding to speak to morning show co-host Carly Rush. When the receptionist informed the man she had left for the day, he walked out of the office, then immediately returned brandishing a pistol. The receptionist escaped to the back of the office and called the Tulsa Police Department. The gunman trapped several employees inside the office and guarded the exit. After approximately ten minutes, police arrived on scene. When the gunman refused to drop his weapon, police fired shots hitting him in the waist. Shortly after, the police handcuffed the man and he was taken to a hospital where he was listed as being in serious condition. No employees were hurt.

Larry Hoefling
Larry Hoefling served as the voice-over talent for the Prevue Guide from 1989 to 1993.

Former DJ.

Previous logo

References

External links
KBEZ station website

BEZ
Griffin Media
Classic hits radio stations in the United States